The Tobol (Tobyl) is a river in Western Siberia (in Kazakhstan and Russia) and the main (left) tributary of the Irtysh.

History
The Tobol River was one of the four important rivers of the Siberia Khanate. In 1428 the khan was killed in a battle with the forces of Abu'l-Khayr Khan at the Battle of Tobol.

In the 16th century, the Tobol was the eastern terminus of the portage route leading westward to the rivers Vishera and Kama.

Cities and towns on the Tobol

 Lisakovsk in Kazakhstan
 Rudni in Kazakhstan
 Kostanay (formerly Nikolaevsk) in Kazakhstan
 Kurgan in the Russian Federation
 Yalutorovsk in the Russian Federation
 Tobolsk in the Russian Federation, where the Tobol joins the Irtysh

Main tributaries
The largest tributaries of the Tobol are, from source to mouth:

 Syntasty (left)
 Ayat (left)
 Uy (left)
 Ubagan (right)
 Iset (left)
 Tura (left)
 Tavda (left)

References

Rivers of Kazakhstan
Rivers of Kurgan Oblast
Rivers of Tyumen Oblast